Ka'abiyye-Tabbash-Hajajre is an Arab local council in the Northern District of Israel. It was declared as a local council in 1996.

See also
Arab localities in Israel

References

Arab localities in Israel
Local councils in Northern District (Israel)